Ansar English School is a private school run by Ansari Charitable Trust (a non-profit charitable organization) located in Perumpilavu, Thrissur district, Kerala, India. The school, founded in 1983, has 4500+ students. Ansar English school is affiliated with the CBSE, New Delhi .

The school has hostel facilities for both boys and girls separately. There is a mosque in the compound of the school where prayers are held.

 The school's vision is to nurture the students to thrive as creative and value driven citizens in a diverse and rapidly changing world.

External links
 http://ansar.in/
 http://ansarschool.in/

Schools in Thrissur district
Educational institutions established in 1983
1983 establishments in Kerala